The 2014–15 South Alabama Jaguars basketball team represented the University of South Alabama during the 2014–15 NCAA Division I men's basketball season. The Jaguars, led by second year head coach Matthew Graves, played their home games at the Mitchell Center and were members of the Sun Belt Conference. They finished the season 12–21, 9–11 in Sun Belt play to finish in a tie for sixth place. They advanced to the quarterfinals of the Sun Belt tournament where they lost to Louisiana–Monroe.

Roster

Schedule

|-
!colspan=9 style="background:#000066; color:#ff0000;"| Exhibition

|-
!colspan=9 style="background:#000066; color:#ff0000;"| Regular season

|-
!colspan=9 style="background:#000066; color:#ff0000;"|Sun Belt tournament

References

South Alabama Jaguars men's basketball seasons
South Alabama
2014 in sports in Alabama
2015 in sports in Alabama